Chironjeeb Mujib is an 2021 Bangladeshi Bengali-language biographical film directed by Nazrul Islam who is script writer of Prime minister of Bangladesh. It stars Ahmed Rubel as Bangabandhu, the first President of Bangladesh and Father of the Nation. The film is based on a portion of The Unfinished Memoirs, written by Bangabandhu, which states his life from 1949 to 1952.

On 24 June 2021, Sheikh Hasina officially unveiled three posters of the film. The teaser came out on October 18. Two months later, the movie's trailer came out. In January 2022, it was alleged that students at a college in Bogra were forced to watch the film.

Plot

Cast
 Ahmed Rubel as Sheikh Mujibur Rahman (alias Bangabandhu)
 Dilara Hanif Purnima as Sheikh Fazilatunnesa Mujib
 Khairul Alam Sabuj as Sheikh Lutfar Rahman
 Dilara Zaman as Sayera Khatun
 S. M. Mohsin
 Azad Abul Kalam
 Shatabdi Wadud
 Shomu Chowdhury
 Arman Parvez Murad
 Shahjahan Shamrat
 Salim Ahamed
 Jewel Mahmud
 Naresh Bhuiyan
 Manosh Bandyopadhyay
 Kayes Chowdhury

Production
Pre-production began four years before the film's release. On January 11, 2020, an agreement was signed to make the film. In September 2021, the film received certificate from the Censor Board.

Release
The film was released on the last day of 2021. The film was premiered in Bogra instead of Dhaka. The Modhuban Cineplex in Bogra was almost houseful that day.

Music

References

External links
 Official website
 

Films about Sheikh Mujibur Rahman
2020s Bengali-language films
2021 films
Bengali-language Bangladeshi films
Bangladeshi biographical films
Films based on autobiographies
Films shot in Bangladesh
Films set in Pakistan
History of Bangladesh on film
Films set in the 20th century
Films based on Bengali language movement
Films scored by Emon Saha
Film controversies in Bangladesh